Region 2 was an administrative district in the city of Johannesburg, South Africa, from 2000 to 2006.  It is known as the Midrand region.  It bordered Region 3 (Sandton), Region 7 (Modderfontein), and Region 1 (Diepsloot). The region was abolished with a reorganisation of regions in 2006.

The development of Region 2 has traditionally centred on the N1, the main highway that links Johannesburg to Pretoria to the north.  Housing in Region 2 is mostly formal with many affluent suburbs.  Midrand has not had much significant development, so a lot of open space remains.  Region 2 currently has a population of 200,000.  While many people in Region 2 are wealthy, the vast majority of residents are poor: 36% earn no reported income at all.

References

Former regions of Johannesburg